The Kwalean or Humene–Uare languages are a small family of Trans–New Guinea languages spoken in the "Bird's Tail" (southeastern peninsula) of New Guinea. They are classified within the Southeast Papuan branch of Trans–New Guinea.

The Kwalean languages are spoken in Rigo District, Central Province, Papua New Guinea.

Languages
The languages are Humene, Uare (Kwale) and recently extinct Mulaha. It is not clear if Mulaha was an outlier, or as close to the others as they are to each other.

Classification
Humene and Uare are quite close (70% basic vocabulary), Mulaha more distant (22% with Uare).

The Kwalean family is not accepted by Søren Wichmann (2013), who splits it into two separate groups, namely Humene–Uare and Mulaha.

Proto-language

Phonemes
Usher (2020) reconstructs the consonant inventory of Humene and Uare as follows:

{| 
| *m || *n ||  ||  || 
|-
| || *t || || *k || *ʔ
|-
| *b || *d || || *g || 
|-
| *ɸ ||  ||  ||  || *h
|-
| *w || *ɾ || *j || *ɣ || 
|}
The *k is rare.

Vowels are *i *e *ɛ *a *ɔ *o *u.

Pronouns
Usher (2020) reconstructs the pronouns of Humene–Uare as:
{| 
! !!sg!!pl
|-
!1
|*ɛ ||*ɛmɛ
|-
!2
|*ɣa ||*ja
|-
!3
|*ani ||*jɛ
|}

Basic vocabulary
Some lexical reconstructions by Usher (2020) are:

{| class="wikitable sortable"
! gloss !! Proto-Humene-Uare !! Humene !! Uare
|-
! hair/feather
| *igu || ˈiʔu || ˈiku
|-
! eye
| *ubuma || uˈbuma || uˈbuma
|-
! nose
| *jajɔɾɛ || ʒaˈʒoɾe || ʒaˈʒoɾe
|-
! tooth
| *ɣɔnɔnɛ || βoˈnone || ɣoˈnone
|-
! tongue
| *majanɛ || maˈnane || maˈʒane
|-
! foot/leg
| *ɔda || ˈoda || ˈida
|-
! blood
| *ɾɔo̝ || ɾoˈo || ˈɾoˈu
|-
! bone
| *e̝tinɛ || eˈhine || iˈsine
|-
! skin
| *ahe̝ɾe̝ || aˈheɾe || aˈhiɾi
|-
! breast
| *nuunɛ || nuˈune || nuˈne
|-
! louse
| *nɔmɔnɛ || noˈmone || noˈmone
|-
! dog
| *ɣo̝ni || βoni || ˈɣuni
|-
! pig
| *aba || ˈaba || ˈaba
|-
! bird
| *ne̝ni; *t[e̝]b[o̝]ɾ[e̝] || neni; teˈboɾe || ˈnini
|-
! egg
| *maɣa || ˈmaβa || ˈmaɣa
|-
! man
| *wajɛ || ˈβaʒe || ˈβaʒe
|-
! woman
| *nɔgɔnɛ || noˈʔone || noˈɣone
|-
! sun/day
| *maˈda || maˈda || maˈda
|-
! moon
| *batɔ || ˈbato || ˈbato
|-
! water
| *wɔu || ˈβou || ˈβou
|-
! fire/firewood
| *iɾɛ || ˈiɾe || iɾe
|-
! stone
| *hadi || ˈhadi || ˈhadi
|-
! path
| *e̝bi || ˈebi || ˈibi
|-
! name
| *ni || ni || ni
|-
! eat
| *an- || an- || an-
|-
! one
| *te̝bɔ || ˈtebo || ˈtiba
|-
! two
| *ahɛu || aˈheu || aˈheu
|}

Vocabulary comparison
The following basic vocabulary words are from Dutton (1970) (with additional data for Uare from 1988 SIL field notes), as cited in the Trans-New Guinea database. Proto-Kwalean reconstructions are from Ross (2014).

{| class="wikitable sortable"
! gloss !! Proto-Kwalean !! Humene !! Mulaha !! Uare
|-
! head
|  || raˈfune || yoarowai || vaˈdini; və'd·inɩ
|-
! hair
| *iku(va) || iʔvuai || yoroba || 'iku; ˈiku
|-
! ear
|  || aˈbi || akuru || 'tʰɛɣʌ; ˈteɣa
|-
! eye
| *(u)bu(i)vi(ma) || uˈbuma || boivi || uˈbuma; u'bumə
|-
! nose
| *ʒaʒore || ʒaˈʒore || ine || ĵ ̟ʌ'ĵ ̟ɔre; ʒaˈʒore
|-
! tooth
| *vono(ne); *wano(ne) || voˈnone || waina (2?) || ɣoˈnone; ɣɔ'nɔne
|-
! tongue
|  || maˈnane || bebura || maˈʒane; mə'j ̟ane
|-
! leg
|  || goˈenva || koina || ɔdʌ; ˈoda
|-
! louse
| *(n)omo(ne) || noˈmone || uˈmana || noˈmone; 'nɔmone
|-
! dog
| *ɣuni || ˈaba || aba || ˈaba; 'ɣunɩ
|-
! pig
| *aba || (voni) aˈva || batuvi || 'ap·ʌ; (ɣuni) aˈvaɣa
|-
! bird
| *teboare || (teˈbore) ˈiʔuva || iguvi || 'ninɩ; (nini) ˈikuɣa
|-
! egg
| *ma(va) || ˈhava || iakeki || iˈsaɣa; 'maɣʌ
|-
! blood
| *ruu || roˈo || iˈaa || iuː; ˈruˈu
|-
! bone
| *esi(ne) || eˈhine || inina || ɩ'ine; iˈsine
|-
! skin
| *ahiri || aˈhere kokava || iaina || a'hiṟʟ; aˈhiri
|-
! breast
| *n(a)u(ne) || nuˈune || kobaiba || 'nune; nuˈne
|-
! tree
|  || iˈbado ||  || ire; 'ire
|-
! man
| *vaʒe || oˈhoʒ; ˈvaʒe ||  || ohɔj ̟e; oˈhoʒe; ˈvaʒe
|-
! woman
| *no'ɣone || noʔˈone || tina || 'lɔɣae; noˈɣone; roˈɣai
|-
! sky
| *adure || aˈdure ||  || aˈdure
|-
! sun
| *mada || maˈda || bauwa || 'madʌ; maˈda
|-
! moon
| *bato || ˈbato || vaisa || ˈbato; 'batʰɔ
|-
! water
| *vou; *wara || ˈvou || vara || ˈvou; vu
|-
! fire
| *ire || ˈire || boareki || ireˈroga; ɩṟɛlokə
|-
! stone
| *hadi || ˈhadi || aroba || 'had·ɩ; ˈhadi
|-
! road, path
|  ||  ||  || 'ibɩ
|-
! name
| *ni || ni || waa anu || ni; niː
|-
! eat
| *anE- || a-nE- || inatu || a-nE-; aᵘ ʔohe
|-
! one
| *teba || ˈtebo || pebogi || ˈtiba; 'tʰipʌ
|-
! two
| *aheu ||  ||  || a'heᵘ
|}

Evolution
Kwale reflexes of proto-Trans-New Guinea (pTNG) etyma are:

maɣa ‘egg’ < *maŋgV
oda ‘leg’ < *k(a,o)ndok[V]
nomone ‘louse’ < *niman
ire ‘tree’ < *inda

References

Further reading
Ross, Malcolm. 2014. Proto-Kwalean. TransNewGuinea.org.

External links 
 Timothy Usher, New Guinea World, Owen Stanley Range
 (ibid.) Proto–Humene–Uare

 
Owen Stanley Range languages
Languages of Central Province (Papua New Guinea)